National Taiwan University of Arts (NTUA) is a university in Banqiao District, New Taipei City, Taiwan. It is the oldest and most prestigious art university in Taiwan.

History
National Taiwan University of Arts (NTUA) was established as the National School of Arts on October 31, 1955. In 1960, the name was changed to the National Taiwan Academy of Arts, and then in August 1994 to the National Taiwan College of Arts. The university took on its present name on August 1, 2001. Education at NTUA emphasizes humanistic thinking, creative production, theoretical analysis and hands-on practice. In terms of scope, the university offers courses on the local and the international, the avant garde and the traditional, the creative and the commercial, and the theoretical and the practical.

NTUA comprises five colleges which include the College of Fine Arts, the College of Design, the College of Communications, the College of Performing Arts, and the College of Humanities. In addition to day division undergraduate programs and graduate programs, there are also Extended Bachelor Degree Courses (evenings), two-year in-service BA programs, and in-service MA programs. The university employs about 190 staff members, 165 full-time faculty members, and 771 part-time teachers. The university is home to about 5000 students.

Organization
 College of Fine Arts
Department of Fine Arts (Graduate School of Printmaking), Department of Sculpture, Department of Painting and Calligraphy Arts (Graduate School of Plastic Arts), Department of Architecture and Art Conservation.

 College of Design
Department of Visual Communication Design, Department of Crafts and Design, Department of Multimedia and Animation Arts, Graduate School of Creative Industry Design (PhD).

 College of Communication
Department of Motion Picture, Department of Radio and Television (Graduate School of Applied Media Arts), Department of Graphic Communication Arts.

 College of Performing Arts:
Department of Drama (Graduate School of Performing Arts), Department of Music, Department of Chinese Music, Department of Dance, Graduate School of Performing Arts (PhD).

 College of Humanities
General Education Center, Physical Education Center, Teacher Education Center, Graduate School of Arts and Humanities Instruction, Graduate School of Art Management and Culture Policy.

Bachelor Degree Program of Architectural Space and Culture Relics in Conservation in Asia Pacific

Research Centers
Historic Object Conservation Research Center (HOCRC)
The center combines traditional techniques and technological restoration concepts, with a focus on the restoration of monuments and decorations to preserve historical relics and represent the beauty of heritage.
Innovation Center for Art and Technology (ICAT)
The center focuses on the development of cross-disciplinary technological experiments in diversified arts, and aims to create an academic and creative center and international platform for the exhibition and reflection of technological arts. 
Center for Sound Arts and Acoustics Research (CSAAR)
CSAAR aims to explore new possibilities for live performance through current music technology. Our Sound Lab was established in 2021 and has a capacity of 30, includes a 32.4 channel speaker based on (an) ambisonic system　array to support experimental work, performances, and exhibitions.
Research Center for Intangible Cultural Heritage (RCICH)
The center offers hands-on courses to preserve intangible cultural assets, integrate traditional techniques with modern design, and train students to obtain the license for traditional crafts.
Center for Physical Arts Experimentation (CPAE)
The center offers experimental courses that innovate and develop body movements for students to experience integration, conflicts, and the exchange of kinetic energy presented by cross-art production.

Notable alumni
 Ang Lee, film director and screenwriter
 Ben Wu, singer and actor
 Brenda Wang, actress and model
 Chang Chin-lan, actress
 Chang Hsin-yan, actress
 Cheng Wei-hao, film director and screenwriter
 Chien Wen-pin, conductor
 Collin Chou, actor and martial artist
 Eve Ai, singer and songwriter
 Gua Ah-leh, actress and singer
 Hou Hsiao-hsien, film director, screenwriter, producer and actor
 Huang Feng-shih, member of Legislative Yuan (2004–2005)
 Jacky Wu, actor, singer, and host
 Jake Hsu, actor
 Jay Chou, actor, musician, singer, composer, songwriter and director
 Joanne Tseng, actress, singer and television host
 Kenji Wu, singer and songwriter
 Ko Chun-hsiung, actor, director and politician
 Kuei Chih-Hung, film director and screenwriter
 Li Tai-hsiang, composer and songwriter
 Li You-chi, politician
 Ma Shui-long, composer
 Matt Wu, actor, film director, and screenwriter
 Mou Tun-fei, filmmaker
 River Huang, actor
 Suming, musician, singer, and songwriter
 Tai Chih-yuan, actor and host
 Ting Shan-hsi, film director and screenwriter
 Wei Haimin, opera singer-actress
 Wen Yi-jen, conductor
 Yvonne Yao, actress

Transportation
The university is accessible within walking distance from Fuzhou Station of the Taiwan Railways.

See also
 List of universities in Taiwan

References

 
1955 establishments in Taiwan
Educational institutions established in 1955
Universities and colleges in Taiwan
Universities and colleges in New Taipei
Technical universities and colleges in Taiwan
Banqiao District